|}

This is a list of House of Assembly results for the 1930 South Australian state election. Each district elected multiple members.

Results by electoral district

Adelaide

Albert

Alexandra

Barossa

Burra Burra

East Torrens

Flinders

Murray

Newcastle

North Adelaide

Port Adelaide

Port Pirie

Stanley

Sturt

Victoria

Wallaroo

West Torrens

Wooroora

Yorke Peninsula

See also
 Candidates of the 1930 South Australian state election
 Members of the South Australian House of Assembly, 1930–1933

References

1930
1930 elections in Australia
1930s in South Australia